Metcalfe County is a county located in the U.S. state of Kentucky. Its county seat is Edmonton. The county was founded in May 1860 and named for Thomas Metcalfe, Governor of Kentucky from 1828 to 1832.  Metcalfe County is part of the Glasgow, KY Micropolitan Statistical Area, which is also included in the Bowling Green-Glasgow, KY Combined Statistical Area.

Geography

Adjacent counties
 Hart County  (northwest)
 Green County  (northeast)
 Adair County  (east)
 Cumberland County  (southeast)
 Monroe County  (south)
 Barren County  (west)

Demographics

As of the census of 2000, there were 10,037 people, 4,016 households, and 2,883 families residing in the county. The racial makeup of the county was 97.26% White, 1.64% Black or African American, 0.25% Native American, 0.07% Asian, 0.13% from other races, and 0.65% from two or more races.  0.53% of the population were Hispanic or Latino of any race.

There were 4,016 households, out of which 32.30% had children under the age of 18 living with them, 58.10% were married couples living together, 10.00% had a female householder with no husband present, and 28.20% were non-families. 25.20% of all households were made up of individuals, and 12.30% had someone living alone who was 65 years of age or older.  The average household size was 2.47 and the average family size was 2.93.

In the county, the population was spread out, with 24.60% under the age of 18, 8.20% from 18 to 24, 28.50% from 25 to 44, 23.60% from 45 to 64, and 15.00% who were 65 years of age or older.  The median age was 38 years. For every 100 females, there were 95.20 males.  For every 100 females age 18 and over, there were 92.60 males.

The median income for a household in the county was $23,540, and the median income for a family was $29,178. Males had a median income of $22,430 versus $18,591 for females. The per capita income for the county was $13,236.  About 18.80% of families and 23.60% of the population were below the poverty line, including 29.20% of those under age 18 and 27.90% of those age 65 or over.

Communities

City
 Edmonton (county seat)

Census-designated place
 Summer Shade

Other unincorporated communities

 Beaumont
 Center
 Cork
 Echo
 Goodluck
 Knob Lick
 Node
 Randolph
 Savoyard
 Sulphur Well
 Wisdom

Ghost Town
 Alone

Landmarks
 The Cut
 Devil's Den Cave

Politics

Metcalfe County lies at the northwestern end of the Unionist bloc of counties that covered the eastern Pennyroyal and the Pottsville Escarpment of the Eastern Coalfield. Metcalfe itself was strongly Unionist during the Civil War, and has been Republican for almost all the period since Reconstruction, though not to the same overwhelming extent as the counties to its east and south: Jimmy Carter even obtained 57 percent of the vote in 1976, and four other Democrats have narrowly carried the county since 1880 – although, as with all of rural Appalachia, the county has become overwhelmingly Republican in the twenty-first century due to views on environmental, social and cultural issues increasingly at odds with the national Democratic party.

See also

 Dry counties
 National Register of Historic Places listings in Metcalfe County, Kentucky
 The Kentucky Headhunters, a country music/southern rock act that formed in Metcalfe County
 Black Stone Cherry, an American hard rock/southern rock act that formed in Metcalfe County (Edmonton, KY)

References

 
Kentucky counties
Glasgow, Kentucky, micropolitan area
Counties of Appalachia
1860 establishments in Kentucky
Populated places established in 1860